The V 1605 Mosel, previously known as the M-1903, was a German trawler, minesweeper, and Vorpostenboot throughout World War II.

History 
The Mosel was laid down as a fishing trawler in 1937 in Bremerhaven for the civilian Hans Kunkel. Two years later, in December of 1939, she was requisitioned by the Kriegsmarine and placed in a minesweeper unit. She was re-designated the M-1903 and received a military crew and light armament. She first saw service in April of 1940 during the invasion of Norway, and assisted in the rescue of the cruiser Lützow as well as rescuing the crew of the sunk minesweeper M-1101 Foch & Hubert.

In 1944, the Mosel was transferred to a Vorpostenboote flotilla in Denmark where she was again re-designated as the V 1605. In October of that year, she was assigned to escort the tanker . On October 15, the tanker and its escort were attacked by 21 Allied Beaufighters and 17 Mosquitoes from Banff and Dallachy Wings sent to attack German shipping. The planes ignited the tanker's load of petroleum and severely damaged the Mosel with 20mm fire. By the end of the attack she was on fire from bow to stern, and sank just a few minutes after the aircraft disengaged. 21 of her crew were killed in the attack.

Shipwreck 
The wreck of the Mosel was rediscovered in 2001 off the southern coast of Norway, submerged under just 50 meters of water. The shipwreck has since become a moderately popular site for experienced divers.

References 

World War II auxiliary ships of Germany
2001 archaeological discoveries
Maritime incidents in October 1944
Ships sunk by British aircraft